Khurrum Sher Zaman is a Pakistani politician who had been a Member of the Provincial Assembly of Sindh, from May 2013 to May 2018.

Early life and education 
He was born on 22 December 1974 in Karachi.

He claimed to have received level education.

He is a businessman and owns a food restaurant in Saddar, Karachi.

Political career

He was elected to the Provincial Assembly of Sindh as a candidate of Pakistan Tehreek-e-Insaf (PTI) from Constituency PS-112 Karachi-XXIV in 2013 Pakistani general election.

He was re-elected to Provincial Assembly of Sindh as a candidate of PTI from Constituency PS-110 (Karachi South-IV) in 2018 Pakistani general election.

References

Living people
Sindh MPAs 2013–2018
1974 births
Pakistan Tehreek-e-Insaf politicians
Pakistani restaurateurs
People from Karachi
Pakistan Tehreek-e-Insaf MPAs (Sindh)
Sindh MPAs 2018–2023